was a Japanese politician and cabinet minister in post-war Japan. He held several cabinet-level positions throughout his career, including Minister for Foreign Affairs, Minister of Finance and Minister of Education.

External links
 

1907 births
1973 deaths
Politicians from Tokyo
Government ministers of Japan
Ministers of Finance of Japan
Foreign ministers of Japan
University of Tokyo alumni